Killara Parish in the County of Killara is a civil parish of Killara County, located in Central Darling Shire at Latitude .

Geography
Killara Parish is on the Darling River and the village of Tilpa, New South Wales is the only settlement in the parish.

The parish has a Köppen climate classification of BSh (Hot semi-desert). The parish is barely inhabited, and the landscape is a flat arid scrubland.

The Parish is mainly an agricultural area, with sheep grazing the primary activity, and some pockets of irrigated land along the river. Tourism,  Fishing and camping are popular along the river.   including farmstay programs on local stations, is the other major local industry. Fishing and camping are popular along the river.

In 1838 Thomas Mitchell (explorer) became the first European to the parish as he travelled down the Darling River.

See also
 Killara, New South Wales 
 Killara County

References

Localities in New South Wales